"Bongo Bong" and "Je ne t'aime plus" (English: "I Don't Love You Anymore") are two pop songs originally written and performed by Manu Chao. In 2006, the songs were combined into one track and covered by British singer Robbie Williams. The track was produced by Mark Ronson, and was released as a promotional single from Williams' seventh solo album, Rudebox, in Eastern Europe in early 2007. Vocals for the song were also provided by the English pop artist Lily Allen. The track does not have a music video, but EMI Music México nevertheless released the song to radio. Promo copies were sent in the beginning of 2007 and the single was released as digital download in early February.

Track listing
CD single
 "Bongo Bong and Je ne t'aime plus"
 "Lovelight" (Dark Horse Remix)

Digital EP
"Bongo Bong and Je ne t'aime plus" (radio edit)
"Bongo Bong and Je ne t'aime plus" (Fedde Le Grand Remix)
"Bongo Bong and Je ne t'aime plus" (Noisia Vocal Remix)
"Bongo Bong and Je ne t'aime plus" (Noisia Trashdance Dub)

Personnel
Lead vocals: Robbie Williams
Backing vocals: Lily Allen
Acoustic and electric guitars: Tiggers
Moog synthesiser: Vaughan Merrick
Trumpet: Dave Guy
Tenor saxophone: Neil Sugarman
Baritone saxophone: Ian Hendrickson-Smith
Fender Rhodes, Juno Bass: Raymond Angry
Juno 106, electric & bass guitar, drum programming and percussion: Mark Ronson
Mixed by Serban Ghenea

Charts

References

2006 songs
2007 singles
Lily Allen songs
Robbie Williams songs
Song recordings produced by Mark Ronson
EMI Records singles